Akiba may refer to:

Fintech 

 Akiba (Fintech)

People
 Akiba (given name)
 Akiba (surname)

Entertainment
 Akiba, a character in the Metal Gear Solid series of video games

Other uses
 Akiba (subgenus), a subgenus of protozoa in the genus Leucocytozoon
 Akiba Commercial Bank, Tanzania
 Akiba Hebrew Academy, the former name of Jack M. Barrack Hebrew Academy, located in Bryn Mawr, Pennsylvania
 Akihabara (often shortened to Akiba), an area of Tokyo well known as a shopping district for video games, anime, manga, and computer goods

See also 
 Akiba Dam, Shizuoka Prefecture, Japan
 Akiba-Schechter Jewish Day School, a Jewish school in Hyde Park, Chicago
 Akiva (disambiguation)